Ivans Klementjevs (born 18 November 1960 in Burtiki) is a Soviet-born Latvian politician and former sprint canoeist who competed from the mid-1980s to the late 1990s. He won three Olympic medals in C-1 1000 m at the 1988, 1992 and 1996 Summer Olympics. The highlight was the gold medal in 1988, which he won as a competitor for the USSR. He trained at Trudovye Rezervy and later at the Armed Forces sports society in Riga when Latvia was part of the Soviet Union.

He also won a total of twelve C-1 medals at the ICF Canoe Sprint World Championships with seven golds (C-1 1000 m: 1985, 1989, 1990, 1991, 1993, 1994; C-1 10000 m: 1989), two silvers (C-1 1000 m: 1986, C-1 10000 m: 1991), and three bronzes (C-1 1000 m: 1987, 1995; C-1 10000 m: 1990). Klementjev's only non C-1 world championship medal was a silver in the C-2 500 m event in 1983.

After retiring from canoeing, Klementijevs entered politics and was a Riga city councillor for the National Harmony Party from 2001–2005, and since 2006 is a member of the Saeima for Harmony.

He was awarded with the highest Latvian state decoration - the Order of the Three Stars, 4th Class in 1999.

References

External links
 
 

1960 births
Living people
People from Krustpils Municipality
National Harmony Party politicians
Social Democratic Party "Harmony" politicians
Deputies of the 9th Saeima
Deputies of the 10th Saeima
Deputies of the 11th Saeima
Deputies of the 12th Saeima
Deputies of the 13th Saeima
Soviet male canoeists
Canoeists at the 1988 Summer Olympics
Olympic canoeists of the Soviet Union
Olympic gold medalists for the Soviet Union
Latvian male canoeists
Canoeists at the 1992 Summer Olympics
Canoeists at the 1996 Summer Olympics
Olympic canoeists of Latvia
Olympic silver medalists for Latvia
Olympic medalists in canoeing
ICF Canoe Sprint World Championships medalists in Canadian
Medalists at the 1996 Summer Olympics
Medalists at the 1992 Summer Olympics
Medalists at the 1988 Summer Olympics
Latvian Academy of Sport Education alumni
Latvian people of Russian descent